Sagua la Chica also known as Sagua is a Rural Settlement and consejo popular (ward) in Camajuani, Cuba. It has a population of 1,447 people. Sagua la Chica has the same name as the Sagua la Chica river and is 174 mi (or 280 km) away from the capital of Havana.

Education 
There is one school in the ward, which is: 

 Restituto Muñiz Primary

Geography
Towns nearby Sagua la Chica include Resulta, Hermanos Toledo, Jumagua, Colonia Miguel del Sol (also known as Miguel del Sol), Jagüey, and Crucero Carolina (also known as just Carolina).

The ward of Sagua la Chica borders the municipality of Encrucijada and the ward of Batalla de Santa Clara.

Economy
According at the DMPF of Camajuani, Sagua la Chica is a settlement not linked to any source of an economic or job development but still are maintained.

See also 
 Sagua la Grande
 Santa Clara, Cuba

References 

Populated places in Villa Clara Province